Poison pill may refer to:
Suicide pill, a physical pill for suicide by poison
Poison pill amendment or wrecking amendment, an addition to a legislative bill that renders it ineffective
 Shareholder rights plan, also called a poison pill, a subclass of anti-takeover provisions that dilutes the attacker's power
Poison pill (NBA), a type of player contract provision for some free agents in the National Basketball Association
Poison pill (NFL), a type of player contract provision for some free agents in the National Football League from 1996 to 2010